Scott County is a county located in the U.S. state of Indiana.  As of 2010, the population was 24,181.  The county seat is Scottsburg.

History
Scott County was formed in 1820 from portions of Clark, Jackson, Jefferson, Jennings, and Washington counties. It was named for Gen. Charles Scott, who was Governor of Kentucky from 1808 to 1812.

Geography

Cities and towns
 Austin
 Scottsburg
 Lexington

Unincorporated towns
 Blocher
 Nabb
 Vienna
 Leota

Townships
 Finley
 Jennings
 Johnson
 Lexington
 Vienna

Adjacent counties
 Jennings County  (northeast)
 Jefferson County  (east)
 Clark County  (south)
 Washington County (west)
 Jackson County (northwest)

Major highways
  Interstate 65
  U.S. Route 31
  State Road 3
  State Road 56
  State Road 160
  State Road 203
  State Road 256
  State Road 356
  State Road 362

Climate and weather 

Government

The county government is a constitutional body, and is granted specific powers by the Constitution of Indiana, and by the Indiana Code.

County Council: The county council is the legislative branch of the county government and controls all the spending and revenue collection in the county. Representatives are elected from county districts. The council members serve four-year terms. They are responsible for setting salaries, the annual budget, and special spending. The council also has limited authority to impose local taxes, in the form of an income and property tax that is subject to state level approval, excise taxes, and service taxes.

Board of Commissioners: The executive body of the county is made of a board of commissioners. The commissioners are elected county-wide, in staggered terms, and each serves a four-year term. One of the commissioners, typically the most senior, serves as president. The commissioners are charged with executing the acts legislated by the council, collecting revenue, and managing the day-to-day functions of the county government.

Court: The county maintains a small claims court that can handle some civil cases. The judge on the court is elected to a term of four years and must be a member of the Indiana Bar Association. The judge is assisted by a constable who is also elected to a four-year term. In some cases, court decisions can be appealed to the state level circuit court.

County Officials: The county has several other elected offices, including sheriff, coroner, auditor, treasurer, recorder, surveyor, and circuit court clerk.  Each of these elected officers serves a term of four years and oversees a different part of county government. Members elected to county government positions are required to declare party affiliations and to be residents of the county.

Scott County is part of Indiana's 9th congressional district and is represented in Congress by Republican Trey Hollingsworth.

Demographics

As of the 2010 United States Census, there were 24,181 people, 9,397 households, and 6,648 families residing in the county. The racial makeup of the county was 97.9% white, 0.4% Asian, 0.2% American Indian, 0.2% black or African American, 0.1% Pacific islander, 0.5% from other races, and 0.7% from two or more races. Those of Hispanic or Latino origin made up 1.5% of the population. In terms of ancestry, 20.1% were American, 15.6% were German, 11.9% were Irish, and 10.0% were English.

Of the 9,397 households, 34.1% had children under the age of 18 living with them, 51.4% were married couples living together, 13.0% had a female householder with no husband present, 29.3% were non-families, and 24.0% of all households were made up of individuals. The average household size was 2.54 and the average family size was 2.97. The median age was 39.3 years.

The median income for a household in the county was $47,697 and the median income for a family was $46,775. Males had a median income of $37,505 versus $30,107 for females. The per capita income for the county was $19,414. About 12.2% of families and 15.9% of the population were below the poverty line, including 22.6% of those under age 18 and 14.4% of those age 65 or over.

2015 HIV Outbreak 
In late 2014 and early 2015, 17 HIV infections arising from Scott County initiated an Indiana Department of Health investigation that would result in the state declaring a public health emergency. The outbreak was fueled in part to intravenous drug use resulting from the opioid epidemic compounded by poor access to HIV testing. The public health crisis led to governor Mike Pence signing an executive order allowing a needle exchange site to open; before that time, needle exchanges were illegal in the state of Indiana. This was cited as the turning point in the outbreak, which allowed the county's only physician, Dr. William Cooke, to provide resources to those at risk or experiencing an HIV outbreak. This became the first needle exchange to exist in Indiana; a total of 9 would ultimately exist in the state. A total of 215 cases were eventually attributed to the outbreak. Despite the success of the program, county officials voted 2–1 to end the needle exchange program in June 2021

See also
 Louisville/Jefferson County–Elizabethtown–Bardstown, KY-IN Combined Statistical Area
 National Register of Historic Places listings in Scott County, Indiana

References

 
Indiana counties
1820 establishments in Indiana
Populated places established in 1820
Sundown towns in Indiana